Jaromierz may refer to the following places:
Jaromierz, Greater Poland Voivodeship (west-central Poland)
Jaromierz, Człuchów County in Pomeranian Voivodeship (north Poland)
Jaromierz, Kwidzyn County in Pomeranian Voivodeship (north Poland)